The Arktisch-Alpiner Garten der Walter-Meusel-Stiftung (2,800 m²) is a nonprofit botanical garden specializing in arctic and alpine plants. It is maintained by the Walter Meusel Foundation at Schmidt-Rottluff-Straße 90, Chemnitz, Saxony, Germany, and open daily except Sunday.

The Arctic-Alpine Garden was founded in 1956 by Walter Meusel, a musician, composer, and author of zoological and botanical books. After his death in 1990, the Walter Meusel Foundation has continued to preserve the garden and perform botanical research and conservation.

Today the garden contains approximately 6,000 plant species with a focus on cold and mountainous regions. It maintains notable collections of willows (Salix), Ericaceae, ferns (Pteridophyta) and mountain plants of New Zealand, as well as good collections of Saxifragaceae and plants from the Himalayas, East Asia, the Caucasus, North and South America, the Alps, and several European low mountain ranges.

See also 
 Botanischer Garten Chemnitz
 List of botanical gardens in Germany

External links 
 Arktisch-Alpiner Garten der Walter-Meusel-Stiftung
 Arktisch-alpine Gärten in Europa
 Natural History Museums in Germany

Botanical gardens in Germany
Gardens in Saxony